Greenfields is a census-designated place in Bern Township, Berks County, Pennsylvania, United States.  It is located approximately one mile to the west of the city of Reading at the confluence of the Tulpehocken Creek and Schuylkill River.  As of the 2010 census, the population was 1,170 residents.

Demographics

References

Census-designated places in Berks County, Pennsylvania
Census-designated places in Pennsylvania